Chi-square automatic interaction detection (CHAID) is a decision tree technique based on adjusted significance testing (Bonferroni correction, Holm-Bonferroni testing). The technique was developed in South Africa and was published in 1980 by Gordon V. Kass, who had completed a PhD thesis on this topic. CHAID can be used for prediction (in a similar fashion to regression analysis, this version of CHAID being originally known as XAID) as well as classification, and for detection of interaction between variables. CHAID is based on a formal extension of AID (Automatic Interaction Detection) and THAID (THeta Automatic Interaction Detection) procedures of the 1960s and 1970s, which in turn were extensions of earlier research, including that performed by Belson in the UK in the 1950s. A history of earlier supervised tree methods together with a detailed description of the original CHAID algorithm and the exhaustive CHAID extension by Biggs, De Ville, and Suen, can be found in Ritschard.

In practice, CHAID is often used in the context of direct marketing to select groups of consumers to predict how their responses to some variables affect other variables, although other early applications were in the fields of medical and psychiatric research.

Like other decision trees, CHAID's advantages are that its output is highly visual and easy to interpret. Because it uses multiway splits by default, it needs rather large sample sizes to work effectively, since with small sample sizes the respondent groups can quickly become too small for reliable analysis.

One important advantage of CHAID over alternatives such as multiple regression is that it is non-parametric.

See also 
Chi-squared distribution
Bonferroni correction
Latent class model
Structural equation modeling
Market segment
Decision tree learning
Multiple comparisons

References

Further reading
 Press, Laurence I.; Rogers, Miles S.; & Shure, Gerald H.; An interactive technique for the analysis of multivariate data, Behavioral Science, Vol. 14 (1969), pp. 364–370
 Hawkins, Douglas M. ; and Kass, Gordon V.; Automatic Interaction Detection, in Hawkins, Douglas M. (ed), Topics in Applied Multivariate Analysis, Cambridge University Press, Cambridge, 1982, pp. 269–302
 Hooton, Thomas M.; Haley, Robert W.; Culver, David H.; White, John W.; Morgan, W. Meade; & Carroll, Raymond J.; The Joint Associations of Multiple Risk Factors with the Occurrence of Nosocomial Infections, American Journal of Medicine, Vol. 70, (1981), pp. 960–970
 Brink, Susanne; & Van Schalkwyk, Dirk J.; Serum ferritin and mean corpuscular volume as predictors of bone marrow iron stores, South African Medical Journal, Vol. 61, (1982), pp. 432–434
 McKenzie, Dean P.; McGorry, Patrick D.; Wallace, Chris S.; Low, Lee H.; Copolov, David L.; & Singh, Bruce S.; Constructing a Minimal Diagnostic Decision Tree, Methods of Information in Medicine, Vol. 32 (1993), pp. 161–166
 Magidson, Jay; The CHAID approach to segmentation modeling: chi-squared automatic interaction detection, in Bagozzi, Richard P. (ed); Advanced Methods of Marketing Research, Blackwell, Oxford, GB, 1994, pp. 118–159
 Hawkins, Douglas M.; Young, S. S.; & Rosinko, A.; Analysis of a large structure-activity dataset using recursive partitioning, Quantitative Structure-Activity Relationships, Vol. 16, (1997), pp. 296–302

Software
 Luchman, J.N.; CHAID: Stata module to conduct chi-square automated interaction detection, Available for free download, or type within Stata: ssc install chaid.
 Luchman, J.N.; CHAIDFOREST: Stata module to conduct random forest ensemble classification based on chi-square automated interaction detection (CHAID) as base learner, Available for free download, or type within Stata: ssc install chaidforest.
 IBM SPSS Decision Trees grows exhaustive CHAID trees as well as a few other types of trees such as CART.
 An R package CHAID is available on R-Forge.

Market research
Market segmentation
Statistical algorithms
Statistical classification
Decision trees
Classification algorithms